Max Reimann (31 October 1898 – 18 January 1977) was a German communist politician and member of the Bundestag.

Biography 
Reimann was born in Elbing (Elbląg), West Prussia (today Poland). He worked as a riveter at the Schichau yards in 1912–16 and was drafted into the German Army in the First World War. In 1913, he became a member of the German Metal Workers' Union and the Socialist Labourers Youth, in 1916 of the Spartakusbund.

In 1918 he was sentenced to 1 year imprisonment for his participation in an anti-war demonstration at Elbing throughout the German Revolution of 1918–19. After his release from prison Reimann moved to Ahlen in 1920 to work as a miner, joined the German Coalminer Union and became a full-time official of the Communist Party of Germany (KPD) in 1921. Reimann fought against the French Occupation of the Ruhr in 1923 and was imprisoned for a short time. Throughout the 1920s, he held several positions within the Revolutionäre Gewerkschafts Opposition (RGO), the Communist union in the Ruhr area.

After the Nazis took over power in Germany in 1933 Reimann continued his work, now in illegal underground and became the head of the RGO in 1934. In 1935 Reimann was a delegate at the 7th Congress of the Comintern in Moscow and later worked for the KPD-Foreign office in Prague. After Germany invaded Czechoslovakia in March 1939 Reimann was arrested on 4 April 1939 and imprisoned at Hamm Prison, Sachsenhausen concentration camp and Falkensee.

After the end of World War II, Reimann was a candidate of the Western KPD organization for the executive committee of the Sozialistische Einheitspartei Deutschlands (SED) but had to quit as the SED activities were limited to East Germany. In 1948, Reimann became chairman of the West German Communist Party.

Reimann was a member of the Landtag of North Rhine-Westphalia in 1946–54, the advisory board of the British Occupation Zone in 1946–48 and the economical board of the Bizone in 1947–49.

He was the head of the KPD group at the parliamentary council and a member of the Bundestag in 1949–53. Reimann attended the funeral of Joseph Stalin in 1953.

In 1954, he moved to East Germany but continued to operate his position as the head of the West German KPD, which was banned in 1956.

Reimann returned to West Germany in 1968, became a member of the newfounded German Communist Party in 1971 and its honorary chairman.
  
Reimann died in Düsseldorf.

References

External links 
 
 Max Reimann.com
 

1898 births
1977 deaths
People from West Prussia
People from Elbląg
German communists
Communist Party of Germany politicians
German Army personnel of World War I
Communists in the German Resistance
Members of the Bundestag for North Rhine-Westphalia
German Communist Party members
Members of the Landtag of North Rhine-Westphalia
German Communist Party politicians